Alfred William Parvin (31 December 1859 – 12 July 1916) was an English first-class cricketer.

Parvin represented Hampshire in a single first-class match against Kent in 1885, which was Hampshire's final season with first-class status until the 1895 County Championship.

Parvin died in Brighton, Sussex on 12 July 1916.

External links
Alfred Parvin at Cricinfo
Alfred Parvin at CricketArchive

1859 births
1916 deaths
Cricketers from Southampton
English cricketers
Hampshire cricketers